Jacques Sadoul (1934  – 18 January 2013) was a French novelist, book editor and non-fiction author.

Work on science fiction
His Histoire de la science fiction moderne (1973) was a major encouragement for the serious, academic study of SF, particularly among the East European peoples of that time, because the book was seen as very respectable, and, it was European, continental, while almost everything else science-fictional was produced across the Lamanche and across the Atlantic.

Sadoul was a well-known SF fan and magazine collector. In Paris, in 1973, he published an album of illustrations from American SF magazines, Hier, l’an 2000.

He was one of the first editors to launch SF successfully in paperback form in France. He was born at Agen, and worked first with “Editions Opta” and then with “J’ai lu”, where he founded the SF imprint and edited the Les Meilleurs Recits series of anthologies of stories translated from the American pulp magazines. He was also a founder of the Prix Apollo award. Hier, l’an 2000: L’illustration de science fiction des annees 30 (1973; translated into English and published in the U.S. in 1975 as: 2000 A.D.: Illustrations From the Golden Age of Science Fiction Pulps), is a book of SF illustrations which he gathered, mostly black-and-white, a selection of SF nostalgia material, but has no index. His Histoire de la science-fiction moderne, 1911-1971 [“History of Modern SF”] (1973; in 2 volumes 1975; revised 1984) is a lengthy and enthusiastic survey of the field, but has been criticized for lacking deep critical analysis and containing too many sweeping generalizations and personal prejudices.

Other work
Sadoul was a prolific novelist. His work includes crime-fiction/spy-fiction novels such as the "Carol Evans cycle" (consisting of ten novels), fantasy novels (such as the trilogy La Passion selon Satan [“The Passion according to Satan”] (1960), Le Jardin de la licorne [“The Garden of the Unicorn”] (1978), and Les hautes terres du rêve) and science fiction novels. In 1987, he received the Grand Prix de Littérature Policière for Trois morts au soleil.

Sadoul has authored works on alchemy, the fantastique and crime fiction. In 2006 he published his memoirs C’est dans la poche !.

References

French science fiction writers
French fantasy writers
French crime fiction writers
People from Agen
1934 births
2013 deaths
French male novelists
French male short story writers
French short story writers
20th-century French novelists
20th-century short story writers
20th-century French male writers